Tornado Måløy Fotballklubb is a Norwegian association football club from Vågsøy, Sogn og Fjordane. It plays in both Måløy and Refvik, and the men's team is situated in the Third Division, the fourth tier of Norwegian football.

History
The foundation of the club was agreed to in December 2002, as a merger between Tornado FK and Måløy IL. The merger was decided on the annual conventions of Tornado and Måløy, and 100% and 85% of the convention-goers in the respective clubs agreed to the merger. The team started its existence in the Third Division, and had both Refvik stadium and Måløy stadium as home fields.

Tornado was the better team before the merger. Måløy was a Fourth Division team at the time. Tornado had in the past fielded players like Geir Televik and the prolific goalscorer Eivind Iversen. After scoring 41 goals in 26 games in the 1996 season, Iversen had offers to join eleven clubs on higher levels. Iversen joined SK Brann, and Tornado stayed in the Third Division until 1998, when it won its group and was promoted to the 1999 Norwegian Second Division. The team remained there until 2002, when it was relegated. It was the seventh best home team, but the second worst away team. It was speculated that a bankruptcy of fellow Second Division team FK Lofoten might save Tornado Måløy, but the bankruptcy was avoided.

Tornado Måløy's first official match was a 2003 Norwegian Football Cup match (first preliminary round), which they won 3–0 against Sandane TIL. In the second preliminary round they lost 0–5 to Stryn TIL. The team ended in third place in its first season, behind IL Jotun and Stryn. In 2004 they came in fourth behind Førde IL, Stryn and Fjøra FK. They dropped another place, to fifth behind Stryn, Sogndal 2, Førde and Fjøra, in 2005. In 2006 they were back at fourth again, behind Stryn, Førde and Sogndal 2. In 2007 they ended in eighth place, their lowest ever placement. A fifth place in 2008, behind Førde, Årdal FK, Sogndal 2 and Fjøra, followed. In 2009 they achieved their best placement so far, with a second place, three points behind Førde. In 2010, they went one better, winning the Sogn og Fjordane section of the Third Division. However, they lost out on promotion after losing the playoff matches against Jevnaker. In 2011, there was 12 Third Division groups instead 24, and Tornado Måløy finished fifth in their group, behind Fana, Bjarg, FBK Voss and Årdal.

Results, men's team
{|class="wikitable"
|-bgcolor="#efefef"
! Season
! 
! Pos.
! Pl.
! W
! D
! L
! GS
! GA
! P
!Cup
!Notes
|-
|2003
|3. Division, section 16
|align=right |3
|align=right|22||align=right|14||align=right|1||align=right|7
|align=right|72||align=right|39||align=right|43
|2nd qualifying round
|
|-
|2004
|3. Division, section 16
|align=right |4
|align=right|22||align=right|12||align=right|3||align=right|7
|align=right|76||align=right|48||align=right|39
|1st qualifying round
|
|-
|2005
|3. Division, section 16
|align=right |5
|align=right|22||align=right|10||4||align=right|8
|align=right|66||align=right|48||align=right|34
|1st qualifying round
|
|-
|2006
|3. Division, section 16
|align=right |4
|align=right|22||align=right|10||align=right|6||align=right|6
|align=right|53||align=right|42||align=right|36
|1st qualifying round
|
|-
|2007
|3. Division, section Sogn og Fjordane
|align=right |8
|align=right|22||align=right|8||align=right|2||align=right|12
|align=right|52||align=right|69||align=right|26
|1st qualifying round
|
|-
|2008
||3. Division, section Sogn og Fjordane
|align=right |5
|align=right|22||align=right|11||align=right|3||align=right|8
|align=right|58||align=right|38||align=right|36
|1st round
|
|-
|2009
||3. Division, section Sogn og Fjordane
|align=right |2
|align=right|22||align=right|15||align=right|2||align=right|5
|align=right|68||align=right|29||align=right|47
|1st round
|
|-
|2010
||3. Division, section Sogn og Fjordane
|align=right |1
|align=right|22||align=right|19||align=right|1||align=right|2
|align=right|86||align=right|21||align=right|55
|1st qualifying round
|Lost playoffs for promotion
|-
|2011
||3. Division, section 8
|align=right|5
|align=right|26||align=right|13||align=right|4||align=right|9
|align=right|51||align=right|47||align=right|43
||1st round
|
|-
|2012
||3. Division, section 8
|align=right|10
|align=right|26||align=right|10||align=right|2||align=right|14
|align=right|42||align=right|62||align=right|32
||1st round
|
|-
|2013
||3. Division, section 8
|||||||||||||||
||1st round
|
|}

References

 Official site 

Football clubs in Norway
Sport in Sogn og Fjordane
Association football clubs established in 2003
2003 establishments in Norway